Montpelier is a historic home in Surry County, Virginia, located near Cabin Point. While the home's builder and date of construction are uncertain, it was built by a member of the Cocke family, most likely one of two men named John Cocke. Its layout and architecture suggest that it was built in the latter half of the eighteenth century, although its date of construction has also been cited as circa 1724. The house is considered to be an "unusually distinctive example" of vernacular architecture in the Tidewater region; additionally, its features and layout provide important evidence as to how local architecture developed in the region. The house was added to the National Register of Historic Places on March 26, 1980.

References

Houses on the National Register of Historic Places in Virginia
National Register of Historic Places in Surry County, Virginia
Houses in Surry County, Virginia
Vernacular architecture in Virginia
Cocke family of Virginia